Alicante Terminal is the central railway station of Alicante, Spain. Commonly referred locally as the RENFE station, the station is part of Adif system, and is a terminal station.

The station accommodates RENFE long-distance and medium-distance trains, and it is the origin of lines C-1 and C-3 of Cercanías Murcia/Alicante (suburban trains). The station is not related to the narrow gauge railway Alicante-Dénia managed by FGV and part of the city's tram network.

In 2013, AVE (high-speed) railway reached Alicante. While a new intermodal station is to be constructed in place of the current terminal, a temporal terminal is to be utilized by the high speed trains.

History 

The first train to Alicante arrived from Madrid on 4 January 1858. It took almost 10 years to construct a railway from Madrid to Alicante, which was carried out by Compañía de los Ferrocarriles de Madrid a Zaragoza y Alicante, a predecessor of RENFE. Passenger services began on 1 March 1858, but the official opening awaited the arrival of Queen Isabella II on 25 May 1858.

The initial design of the stations along the Almansa-Alicante part of the railway was approved in 1853. Additional extensions to the projects were made in 1857. It was one of the largest terminals built in Spain in those years.

Between 1967 and 1968 the original facade of the Alicante station was completely rebuilt.

Services

The station services Alicante and Murcia suburban areas with a frequency of 1 or 2 trains per hour on line C-1 and with eight trains per day on line C-3. The station is the origin for both lines and is located in tariff area 6 of the Cercanías Murcia/Alicante network.
The station is used by medium-distance RENFE trains such as Regional Express or Regional with services to Valencia, Murcia, Cartagena, Albacete, Villarrobledo, and Ciudad Real as lines L-1 and L-2.
Barcelona and Madrid are the primary destinations of long-distance trains operated by Renfe. With the completion of high-speed railway (AVE), a trip from Madrid to Alicante now takes between 2h20 mins and 2h40 mins.

References

Railway stations in the Valencian Community
Railway station
Railway stations in Spain opened in 1858